Cleaning Up is a South Korean television series based on the 2019 British series of the same name, starring Yum Jung-ah, Jeon So-min, and Kim Jae-hwa. It aired on JTBC from June 4 to July 24, 2022, every Saturday and Sunday at 22:30 (KST) for 16 episodes.

Synopsis
Cleaning Up tells the story of three cleaners: Eo Yong-mi (Yum Jung-ah), Ahn In-kyung (Jeon So-min), and Maeng Soo-ja (Kim Jae-hwa) at a financial company who resort to insider trading, in order to feed their family and fulfil their dreams, after accidentally overhearing a piece of financial information.

Cast

Main
 Yum Jung-ah as Eo Yong-mi
 Jeon So-min as Ahn In-kyung
 Kim Jae-hwa as Maeng Soo-ja
 Lee Moo-saeng as Lee Young-shin
 Na In-woo as Lee Doo-yeong

Supporting

Persons related to investment securities
 Jang Shin-young as Geum Jan-di
 Song Jae-hee as Yoon Tae-kyung
 Song Young-chang as Song Woo-chang

People around Eo Young-mi
 Kim Tae-woo as Jin Seong-woo
 Yoon Kyung-ho as Oh Dong-ju
 Kal So-won as Jin Yun-ah
 Hae-eun as Boo So-yeon 
 Kim Si-ha as Jin Xi-ah
 Gil Hae-yeon as Bo-ran
 Jeon Kook-hyang as Jang Kyung-ja
 Yoon Jin-ho as Eo Yong-gyu

People around Maeng Soo-ja
 Go In-beom as Jung Sa-jang 
 Kwon Ji-woo as Jung Geun-woo

People around Ahn In-kyung
 Oh Seung-yoon as Byeong Ryul

Investment & Securities Service Cleaning Team
 Kim In-kwon as Cheon Deok-gyu
 Park Ji-ah as Seok-soon 
 Kim Na-yul as Hye-sook
 Son Jeong-rim as Bok-gi
 Hwang Jung-min as Geum-sil

Extended
 Ha Shi-eun as Boo So-yeon
 Lee Tae-gum as Park Seong-gyu

Special appearances
 Kim Hye-yoon as Joo-hyeon
 Yoo Young-jae as Yongmi's nephew
 Cha Chung-hwa as Dongseo 
 Kim Hye-hwa as Song Mi-hwa

Viewership

Notes

References

External links
  
 
 
 

JTBC television dramas
Korean-language television shows
Television series by JTBC Studios
2022 South Korean television series debuts
2022 South Korean television series endings